Þríhnúkagígur (anglicized as Thrihnukagigur, literally translated as Three Peaks Crater) is a dormant volcano in the volcanic system of Brennisteinsfjöll near Reykjavík, Iceland. It was discovered in 1974 by cave explorer Árni B Stefánsson, and opened for tourism in 2012. It is the only volcano in the world where visitors can take an elevator and safely descend into the magma chamber. The magma that would normally fill the chamber and become sealed is believed to have drained away, to the bewilderment of most scientists, revealing the rift beneath the surface.

In August 2015, the members of the Icelandic band Kaleo and fourteen support staff descended into the volcano's magma chamber and recorded a live rendition of the band's song "Way Down We Go".

In 2016, the Secret Solstice music festival announced that alternative rock musician Chino Moreno of Deftones will perform the first ever public concert inside the magma chamber of a volcano.

Images

References 

Volcanoes of Iceland
Dormant volcanoes